The E.S. Levy Building, also known as the National Hotel Building is a historic structure in Galveston, Texas. Originally the Tremont Opera house, some of the walls were retained when it was re-designed as the E.S. Levy department store in 1896. It was built for E.S. Levy & Co. and Ed S. Levy. It was added to the National Register of Historic Places on November 13, 2003. The building is located at 2221-2225 Market Street.

See also

National Register of Historic Places listings in Galveston County, Texas

References

External links

Commercial buildings on the National Register of Historic Places in Texas
Commercial buildings completed in 1896
Buildings and structures in Galveston County, Texas
Department stores on the National Register of Historic Places
National Register of Historic Places in Galveston County, Texas